Zdzisław may refer to:

People
 Zdzisław (given name), a Slavic male given name

Places
 Zdzisław, Lubusz Voivodeship, a village in Poland
 Zdzisław Krzyszkowiak Stadium, a multi-use stadium in Bydgoszcz, Poland